Coleophora bogdoensis is a moth of the family Coleophoridae. It is found in the Schibendy valley in the southern Ural Mountains and the Baskunzak salt lake in the lower Volga region of Russia. It has also been recorded from north-western Kazakhstan.

Etymology
The specific name refers to the village Bogdo, which is situated close to the place where the majority of the type material was collected.

References

bogdoensis
Moths described in 2007
Moths of Asia